The Yamada Building is a historic structure located at 516 5th Avenue in San Diego's Gaslamp Quarter, in the U.S. state of California. It was built in 1869.

See also
 List of Gaslamp Quarter historic buildings

References

External links

 

1869 establishments in California
Buildings and structures completed in 1869
Buildings and structures in San Diego
Gaslamp Quarter, San Diego